This sets forth a timeline of the War in Somalia during 2008.

 5 February
 Bosaso bombings. 25 Ethiopian civilians killed

 2 March
 Missile attack on Dobley. 6 Somali civilians killed

 19–20 April
 Battle of Mogadishu. 11 Ethiopian soldiers, 7 Somali soldiers, 10 insurgents, and 98 civilians killed
 Hidaya Mosque massacre. 11 Somali civilians killed

 1 May
 Dhusamareb airstrike. 2 Somali soldiers, 6 insurgents, 5 civilians killed

 1–26 July
 Battle of Beledweyne. 50 Ethiopian soldiers, 39-75 insurgents, 22 civilians killed

 20–22 August
 Battle of Kismayo. 89 people killed

Incumbents 
 President: Abdullahi Yusuf Ahmed (until 29 December), Adan Mohamed Nuur Madobe (starting 29 December)
 Prime Minister: Nur Hassan Hussein

See also 
Somalia War (2006–2009)
Somali Civil War (2009–present)
2006 timeline of the War in Somalia
2007 timeline of the War in Somalia
2009 timeline of the War in Somalia

References

 
Years of the 21st century in Somalia
2000s in Somalia
Somalia
Somalia